Singidunum University is a higher education institution in Belgrade, Serbia which offers undergraduate, master and doctoral academics studies in three scientific fields – social sciences and humanities; technical sciences; and natural sciences and mathematics. The university consists of three faculties, and has around 7,300 enrolled students as of 2018–19 school year, which makes it the largest private university in Serbia.

The first faculty was founded in 1999, and the University itself was established on 17 January 2005. The University is organized according to the principles of the Bologna Declaration (Bologna Process) education model, and it applies the European Credit Transfer System (ECTS). The curricula and study programmes were designed in line with respectable European universities and colleges models, whilst relying on Serbian education system best practices.

Organization

Integrated faculties 
 Faculty of Business in Belgrade
 Faculty of Tourism and Hospitality Management
 Faculty of Informatics and Computing
 Faculty of Technical Sciences
 Faculty of Physical Education and Sports Management
 Anglistics
 Environment and sustainable development studies
 Singidunum Center Novi Sad
 Singidunum Center Nis

Faculties with special legal entities status 
 Faculty of Health, Legal and Business Studies in Valjevo (FZPP)
 Faculty of Media and Communications (FMK)

Singidunum University Institute, as a part of the integrated university, is dedicated to scientific research, participation in Erasmus+ programmes and international projects.

Studies

Singidunum University was accredited by the Commission for Accreditation and Quality Assurance for the study programmes.

Academic studies of the following levels are realized:
     Bachelor studies, duration – four years 
     Master studies, duration – one to two years
     Doctorate studies, duration – three years

Study in English 
Singidunum University has accredited undergraduate, master's and doctoral degree programs in English. The complete study programs are taught in English, which allows students to easily fit into the contemporary business environment or to continue their studies at well-known universities all over the world. Thanks to special cooperation agreements, students of Singidunum University can continue their education at Franklin University, Herzing University and the Russian Presidential Academy in St. Petersburg.

Management

All activities of Singidunum University are regulated by internal governing bodies: the University Council, the Rector’s Collegium, the University Senate and the Elective Council.

Students 
Around 12,000 students are currently enrolled at Singidunum University. The University has 20,000 m2 of high quality space, equipped with modern computer and internet infrastructure, audiovisual and other equipment necessary for efficient educational activities: 20 amphitheatres, 50 lecture halls, and 14 computer rooms. Internet access is available in the entire area of Singidunum University, where the centre for foreign languages, the library, offices for consultations, a bank and a student café are located as well.

The Student Service of Singidunum University represents an info centre where students can get information regarding the studies and other activities at the University.

Career Center provides assistance to students in developing skills for effective and efficient job search through specific individual and group counselling programs.

Students are actively involved in the work of the University through the Student Parliament and the President of the Student Parliament.

Publishing 
Singidunum University has developed its own university press. All textbooks and manuals for scientific disciplines included in the curricula are published within the university.

The University also publishes scientific journal, The European Journal of Applied Economics. The Ministry of Education and Science of the Republic of Serbia has ranked it, in the latest classification, as the top journal of national importance (M51). The journal is published twice a year and it is dedicated to scientific papers in the field of economics, management, tourism, information technology and law. The journal is available in electronic format on the portal www.journal.singidunum.ac.rs.

Certificates 
Various internationally recognized certificates can be acquired at Singidunum University, such as:
 IBM
 European Computer Driving Licence
 ORACLE
 Cisco
 SAP
 Micros Fidelio
 Galileo
 Amadeus
 Sybase
 EMC2
 Pantheon
 Certiport
Within the Centre for Foreign Languages at Singidunum University, the following certificates can be obtained: 
 ESOL Certificate in English, in cooperation with the British Council
 DELE Certificate in Spanish, in cooperation with the Cervantes Institute
 PLIDA Certificate in Italian, in cooperation with the Dante Alighieri Society

International cooperation 
Singidunum University has developed successful cooperation with educational institutions worldwide.

Current collaborating institutions:
 IMC University of Applied Sciences Krems, Austria
 University of Cambridge, UK
 Huron University, UK
 Bocconi University, Italy 
 Ca' Foscari University, Italy 
 University of Bologna, Italy 
 University of the Balearic Islands, Spain
 Corvinus University, Hungary
 University of Primorska, Slovenia 
 Sinergija University, Bosnia and Herzegovina
 University of Banja Luka, Bosnia and Herzegovina
 University Mediteran, Montenegro
Franklin University, Herzing University
North West Institute of Management of the Russian Presidential Academy from St. Petersburg

Previous collaborating institutions:
 Beijing Institute of Technology, China
 Budha School of Creative Studies
 Cyprus University of Technology
 D.A. Tsenov Academy of Economics, Svishtov, Bulgaria
 Dalian Neusoft Institute of Information, China
 Dimitrie Cantemir Christian University, Romania
 Faculty of Law from Cluj-Napoca of Dimitrie Cantemir Christian University, Romania
 Frankfurt University of Applied Sciences, Germany
 Guandarma University, Indonesia
 Guglielmo Marconi University, Italy
 Hellenic American University, USA
 Herzing University, USA
 Italian Cultural Institute in Belgrade
 Kahramanmaras Sutcu Imam University, Turkey
 Kauno Kolegija/ University of Applied Sciences, Lithuania
 Kwantlen Polytechnic University, Canada
 Liepaja University, Latvia
 Moscow Institute of Linguistics, Russia
 Obuda University Budapest, Hungary
 Open University of Cyprus
 Opole University of Technology, Poland
 Plekhanov Russian University of Economics
 Richmond The American International University in London, UK
 Riga Technical University, Latvia
 Russian State University of Trade and Economics
 St. Cyril and St. Methodius University of Veliko Tarnovo, Bulgaria
 Technical University of Crete, Cyprus
 Technical University of Hamburg, Germany
 The University of Basilicata (Università degli Studi della Basilicata), Italy
 Universita degli Studi di Salerno, Italy
 University American College, Skopje
 University College of Enterprise and Administration, Lublin, Poland
 University of Applied Sciences IMC Krems, Austria
 University of National and World Economy, Sofia
 University of Primorska, Slovenia
 University of Tartu, Estonia
 University of Tourism and Management, Skopje
 University Sinergija, Bijeljina
 Varna University of Management, Bulgaria
 Wrocław University of Economics, Poland

Additional information 
The University is also a Member of Conference of Universities of Serbia (Konferencija univerziteta Srbije - KONUS), Association of Universities of Serbia (Zajednica univerziteta Srbije - ZUS), an Associate Member of the World Tourism Organization UNWTO and a Winner of several IT Globus awards.

See also
 Education in Serbia
 List of universities in Serbia

References

External links 
 

Sin
Universities in Belgrade
Education in Belgrade